Plealey Road railway station was a station to the north of Plealey, Shropshire, England. The station was opened in 1861 and closed in 1951.
The station was single track to the south of the level crossing. On the northern side was a goods yard with passing loop or goods loop equipped with a loading gauge

References

Further reading

Disused railway stations in Shropshire
Railway stations in Great Britain opened in 1861
Railway stations in Great Britain closed in 1951
Former Great Western Railway stations
Former London and North Western Railway stations